Bellelay Abbey is a former Premonstratensian monastery in the Bernese Jura in Switzerland, now a psychiatric clinic.  It is a heritage site of national significance and the entire former Abbey complex is part of the Inventory of Swiss Heritage Sites.

History

According to the legend, the monastery was founded in 1136 by Siginand, prior of the abbey of Moutier-Grandval, who got lost in the deep forest of the High Jura while hunting a wild boar and was unable to find his way out. He vowed to found a monastery if he managed to return safely to Moutier, which he did four days later. To the monastery he founded in accordance with his vow he gave the name of "belle laie" ("laie" is a female wild boar).

According to other sources, the monastery was probably founded as a result of the influence of the Bishop of Basel on the south-west border of the diocese of Basel with the territory of the Abbot of Moutier-Grandval.

The foundation was confirmed by Pope Innocent II in 1142. There are numerous spelling variations from the early years of the monastery: Balelaia, Belelagia, Belelai, Belilaia, Bellale, Bella Lagia, Bellelagia and Bellilagia. The name comes from the Vulgar Latin bella lagia ("beautiful forest").

The abbey possessed various estates widely scattered. It was the mother-house of several other foundations, including Grandgourt Priory, Gottstatt Abbey and Himmelspforte Abbey at Grenzach-Wyhlen in Baden-Württemberg.

Bellelay was under the authority of the diocese of Basel, but operated as an independent lordship under the terms of a protection contract agreed with Bern and Solothurn (by 1414 at the latest) and also with Biel in 1516.

Although the abbot had the right of the low justice in the abbey's immediate territory, and was awarded the right to the use of the ring, the mitre and the cross at the Council of Constance in 1414, it does not seem that Bellelay was ever an Imperial abbey.

The buildings were ransacked during the Swabian War in 1499. During the Protestant Reformation some of the residents converted to the new faith.  However, thanks to the treaty with Solothurn the monastery was spared the effects of the Thirty Years' War. The abbey reached its golden age in the 18th century as a renowned place of education for the sons of European nobility.  During the 18th century the monastery buildings were rebuilt and a new church building was dedicated in 1714.  The monastery university opened in 1772 and by 1779 it had 62 pupils from throughout Europe.  A new dormitory wing was added in 1782 to accommodate the growing student population and by 1797 there were about 100 students at Bellelay.

Dissolution
In 1797 the buildings were occupied by French troops and secularised. The precious furnishings were sold at this time – an altar from Bellelay, for example, is now to be found in the parish church of Our Lady of the Assumption in Saignelégier.

In the 19th century the monastery premises were used as a watch factory, then as a brewery and finally as a glass factory. In 1890 the Canton of Bern acquired the site, from which time the monastery buildings have been used as a psychiatric clinic.

Since the end of the 1960s the premises have also been used for concerts and exhibitions by the Fondation de l'Abbatiale de Bellelay.

Architecture 

The present structure of the abbey church of the Assumption was built by Franz Beer on the Vorarlberg Baroque model between 1708 and 1714. The church has two towers on the west front which formerly had onion domes. The interior is decorated with painted stucco by the Wessobrunn School, created in 1713. The other monastery buildings in the Baroque style are also from the 18th century.

Tête de Moine
Bellelay Abbey is the home of the cheese Tête de Moine, first made by the monks in the 12th century.

List of Abbots of Bellelay

 Geroldus 1142–1180
 Ludovicus 1187–1202
 Adam 1195
 Richardus 1202–1237
 Henricus I of Soulce 1237–1256
 Jacobus I von Wetterau 1256–1258
 Conradus 1258–1270
 Name unknown, possibly died 1276
 Petrus I of Varres 1289–1296
 Burchardus of Boécourt 1298–1316
 Lambertus 1316–1326
 Petrus II de Sancey 1326–1336
 Henricus II de Bassecourt 1337–1350
 Petrus III de Vannes 1350–1354
 Jacobus II de Séprais 1365–1374
 Joannes III de Pontenet 1374–1398
 Joannes IV Donzelat 1398–1401
 Henricus III Nerr 1401–1418
 Heinzmann (Henricus IV) Girardin 1418–1426
 Joannes V de Chatelat 1426–1434
 Petrus IV Martini 1434–1438
 Heinzmann (Henricus V) 1438–1448
 Joannes VI Rier 1448–1456
 Joannes VII Gruel or Grier 1456–1483
 Joannes VIII Barth 1483–1490
 Joannes IX Brullard 1490–1508
 Nicolaus I Schnell 1508–1530
 Joannes X Gogniat 1530–1553
 Servatius Fridez 1553–1561
 Antonius Fottel 1561–1574
 Joannes XI Simon 1574–1579
 Werner Spiessbrecher (Brieselance) 1579–1612
 David Juillerat 1612–1637
 Joannes XII Petrus Cuénat 1637–1666
 Joanns XIII Georgius Schwaller 1666–1691
 Norbertus Périat 1691–1692
 Fridericus de Staal 1692–1706
 Joannes XIV Georgius Voirol 1706–1719
 Joannes XV Sémon 1719–1743
 Gregorius Joliat 1743–1771
 Nicolaus II Deluce 1771–1784
 Ambrosius Monnin 1784–1807

Notes

Sources
 
 The reproduction of the Bossard organ from 1721 by Kuhn Organ Builders Ltd.
Fondation de l'abbatiale de Bellelay 
 Website source of list of abbots

Christian monasteries in Switzerland
Premonstratensian monasteries in Switzerland
Hospitals in Switzerland
Buildings and structures in the canton of Bern
Hospitals established in the 12th century 
1797 disestablishments in Europe
18th-century disestablishments in the Old Swiss Confederacy
Christian monasteries established in the 12th century
Roman Catholic churches completed in 1714
1136 establishments in Europe
12th-century establishments in Switzerland
18th-century churches in Switzerland